Ditcham Park School is a co-educational, independent school in the civil parish of Buriton, near Petersfield, in the English county of Hampshire.

Location 
The school and its grounds are on the southern spur of Oakham Hill (202 m), one of the highest points on the South Downs. It is located some 2 kilometres south-southwest of the village of Buriton and 2 kilometres northeast of the hamlet of Chalton. The premises was previously owned by Douai School (closed in 1999) and housed its Junior School until 1975.

Facilities
The school grounds include a walled garden, tennis courts and sports fields, which adjoin several farms and forests; the main section of the school is a Victorian manor house, built in 1887. A Technology and Arts building was added in 2001, a new sports hall in 2008 and renovations of the science block made in 2012. In 2017 a new, purpose built Junior classroom block was completed.  It was opened by BBC journalist, Clive Myrie on 20 September 2017. In 2018 Ditcham Dragonflies, the school nursery was opened.

Notable former pupils

Tamsin Egerton, actor
Zoe French, model
Richard Harwood, cellist

House history

Laurence Trent Cave bought the Estate in 1887.  In 1940 the house was requisitioned by the Royal Navy and used as a convalescent home for sailors and served by trains stopping at Woodcroft halt.  After the war it became a boys preparatory school run by Douai School Monks and then in September 1976 Ditcham Park School was founded by Paddy Holmes.

School Fees
The fee for the academic year 2017/2018 are between £2,835 and £4,753 (depending on the child's age) per term. There are additional charges for transport, lunches, private tuition and extra curricular activities.

See also
Private schools
Hampshire
Churcher's College

References

External links
Official site
BBC League Table

Educational institutions established in 1976
Private schools in Hampshire
Country houses in Hampshire

1976 establishments in England